Mid-West University is a public university located in Birendranagar, Surkhet, the headquarters of the Karnali Province of Nepal, formerly the headquarters of the Mid western development region of Nepal.

It is an autonomous and public higher education institution.

History
The parliamentary act, established by the Nepalese government on June 17, 2010, based on the concept of a multi-university system, is a state-backed institution based on land donated by the Nepalese government. The campus of the university and Central Executive Office is located in Birendranagar, in the Surkhet district of Nepal.

Faculties
Faculty of Engineering
Faculty of Management
Faculty of Science and Technology
Faculty of Education
Faculty of Humanities and Social Sciences

Faculty of Agriculture and Forestry Sciences
Faculty of Health Sciences

Schools, Campuses & Colleges

Central Schools
Graduate School of Engineering, Surkhet
Graduate School of Science and Technology,Surkhet  
Graduate school of Education, Surkhet
Graduate school Of Humanities and Social Sciences, Surkhet
Graduate school of Management, Surkhet
Mid-West University School of Law, Surkhet
Graduate school of Agriculture and Forestry, Surkhet

Autonomous School
Mid West university School of Management(MUSOM), Surkhet

Constituent Campuses
Bageshwari Multiple Campus, Banke
Babai Multiple Campus, Bardiya
Narayan Multiple Campus, Dailekh
Tila Karnali Multiple Campus, Kalikot
Rara Multiple Campus, Mugu
Musikot Khalanga Multiple Campus, Rukum
Bheri Gyanodaya Multiple Campus, Jajarkot
Jaljala Multiple Campus, Rolpa
Bheri Multiple Campus, Surkhet
Biddyapur Janata Multiple Campus, Surkhet

Affiliated Colleges
 Global College International(GCI), Kathmandu

Others

Research and Development center, Surkhet

Center for Cosmopolitan languages and professional skill Development, Surkhet

MU-Sports and yoga Academy, Surkhet

Karnali institute of indigenous studies and Technology, Surkhet

See also 
 Tribhuvan University
 Kathmandu University
 Purbanchal University
 Pokhara University

References

External links 
 

Universities and colleges in Nepal
Educational institutions established in 2010
2010 establishments in Nepal